Aristiidae is a family of crustaceans belonging to the order Amphipoda.

Genera:
 Aristias Boeck, 1871
 Boca Lowry & Stoddart, 1997
 Memana Stoddart & Lowry, 2010
 Perrierella Chevreux & Bouvier, 1892
 Pratinas Stoddart & Lowry, 2010

References

Amphipoda